Reece High School is a government co-educational comprehensive secondary school located in , Tasmania, Australia. Established in the 1950s, the school caters for approximately 450 students from Years 7 to 12 and is administered by the Tasmanian Department of Education.

In 2019 student enrolments were 470. The school principal is Grant Armitstead.

History

December 2000 fire 

The old Reece High School was destroyed by a fire in December 2000. The cause of the fire was unknown and was believed to be caused by arson. Planning and reconstruction of a new school began soon after, however during the two years of reconstruction, students from Reece High School co-located with Devonport High School, with both schools operating independently from the one campus.

Re-establishment in 2003 

Reece High School reopened its doors to students in 2003. The new school was designed to take advantage of technology and facilities unimagined in the previous institution. Classrooms were equipped with power outlets, windows and toilet facilities and attempts were made to enable wireless internet access throughout the school. Of the school's 10 million rebuild budget, a significant portion was spent on AV equipment. The most notable purchases being the introduction of televisions and a PA system. This action was made in order to better prepare students for a world where technology is the norm.

The year 7 and 8 classrooms or PLAs (Primary Learning Areas) were built in clusters of four linked by walls, so as to allow interaction between classes. These walls were more soundproof than previous walls, and stopped noise between classrooms. The other home rooms in the school were of more conventional design, but more spacious and revamped to take advantage of the school's technological renovations. All rooms in the school are lit and most have windows, unlike many other Tasmanian schools.

Reece High's motto - Realising Potential - is both a reference to the 2000 fire and to the teaching goals of Reece High's staff. The former is a mention to the way that the school managed to successfully relocate during after the fire. The latter is the conviction that every student has the right to achieve and realise their own potential in what they do. This extends past the walls of the classroom, into both personal life and careers. Without undermining the importance of academic achievement, this philosophy alleviates the competitiveness between students that is the hallmark of an academic institution, and allows students to focus on achieving their potential.

Curriculum 

As a public school, Reece High School receives funding from the Australian and Tasmanian governments. It follows the national curriculum and teaches, assesses, and reports using the Essential Learnings (ELs) system. These focus on skill and ability acquisition rather learning by rote. Reece High was one of the first schools to use the ELs system, and due to its successes caused the system to be implemented nationally. Principal, Sheree Vertigan, praises the ELs system and encouraged its use in other schools. Although there was some discussion of the ELs effectiveness at first, most people are now in favour of the system.

Events 

Reece High's chief fundraising event is the two-day Garden Weekend, held every year at the school. Individuals and classes contribute to running the event, which often includes musical and dramatic numbers performed during the event.

Uniform 

Reece High School, like most Australian schools, has a uniform policy. Boys wear blue shirts and grey shorts. Girls wear either the winter skirt and blue shirt, or the summer dress. Boys may wear a navy hoodie in winter and both may wear a navy spray jacket with the school emblem.

There is an optional sports uniform that may only be worn on each year group's sporting days. Casual, sport appropriate clothing is accepted.
Adidas three stripe shorts are prohibited as of June 2014 as they were a gang statement among students.

Awards 

 2004 Tasmanian Department of Education - Learning Together Award
 2003 James D. MacConnell Award from the Council of Educational Facilities Planners International for Building Design excellence
 2002 School Construction News and Design Share Award for Innovative Learning Environments

Reece High School was identified as one of two high demand schools in Tasmania by the Australian Government.

See also 
Education in Tasmania
List of schools in Tasmania

References

External links 
 Reece High School website

Public high schools in Tasmania
Devonport, Tasmania
1950s establishments in Australia
Educational institutions established in the 1950s